Alektora is a village in the Limassol District of Cyprus, located 6 km north of Pissouri. Prior to 1960, the village was inhabited almost exclusively by Turkish Cypriots.

References

Communities in Limassol District